This is a list of notable present professional training camps and gyms in Mixed Martial Arts (MMA).

Most professional MMA fighters in the UFC, Bellator and other MMA promotions join a professional fight camp or training gym to help them prepare for fights. Training at a top camp can be a big advantage to fighters, as not only do they have access to multi-disciplinary coaching, but they can also train against the other top fighters at the camp and nominate members of the camp as corner men. By training a group of elite fighters together, they will all learn from each other's skill sets and can support each other living the disciplined fighter lifestyle. Before a fight, a fighter will undergo an intensive training regime of several weeks, often culminating in a dramatic weight cut to make the required fighting weight, and the other members in the fighting camp are an important part of this process.

Currently the intense rivalries between the top fighting camps and the fighters training there is an under-reported part of professional MMA. Occasionally there will be a high-profile split or conflict between members of a camp, particularly when two closely matched fighters are in the same weight class. For example, one of the current top MMA teams the Blackzillians was formed when former UFC light heavyweight champion Rashad Evans left Jackson-Wink MMA, in an acrimonious split relating to head coach Greg Jackson's support for up and coming contender Jon Jones' title shot when Evans was injured.

References

 
Mixed martial arts organizations
Mixed martial arts lists